Tumauini, officially the Municipality of Tumauini, is a 1st class municipality in the province of Isabela, Philippines. According to the 2020 census, it has a population of 70,743 people.

The Tumauini Church is currently on the tentative list for UNESCO World Heritage Sites under the Baroque Churches of the Philippines (Extension). A proposal has been suggested by scholars to make a separate UNESCO inclusion for the Old Centre of Tumauini which includes the Tumauini Church. The same would be done for other churches listed in UNESCO's tentative sites, where each town plaza and surrounding heritage buildings would be added. No government agency has yet taken action on the proposal.

Etymology
The name of Tumauini originated from the name of the big trees found in the Poblacion called "Mauini". It is said that when some Spaniards wanted to know the name of the trees, they asked a native saying, "Como se llama el grande lenia? Sabes tu?" The native not knowing what the Spaniards said, picked the last word he heard and answered "Tumauini".

History
In 1952, the barrios of Barucbuc, Siempre Viva, Bimmonton, Pasurgong, Manga, and Settlement No. 1 were transferred to the newly created town of Mallig.

In 1957, the barrios of San Antonio, San Juan, Ragan Sur, Ragan Norte, Ragan Almacen, San Jose (Bulo), San Patricio, Quibal, San Andres (Lattu), Calinawan Sur, Bayabo, Santor, Santo Rosario, Andarayan, Aneg, San Isidro, Mawi, San Roque, Carmencita, Aga, Villa Pareda, Villaluz, San Pedro, Concepcion, Sammabario and San Nicolas and the sitios of Turod, Paco, Calamagui and Kim-malabasa, were separated from the municipality of Tumauini to form the town of Magsaysay. Camp Samal used to be the camp of guerillas in 1945 World War II, and Camp Samal had been also used by the Filipino American troops against the Japanese invasion, and SAMAL derives from SA means Sadornas, and MAL from Malana.

Geography
Tumauini is located in the northern portion of the province of Isabela.

Barangays
Tumauini has politically subdivided into 46 barangays. These barangays are headed by elected officials: Barangay Captain, Barangay Council, whose members are called Barangay Councilors. All are elected every three years.

Four of the barangays compose the center of the town whereas the other 42 are in the outlying areas. Some of them are even several kilometers away from the center of the municipality. The most populous are San Pedro, Antagan I, and Lanna.

Climate

Demographics

Economy 

Over the past years, the town's economy had dramatically shifted from stagnant to a fast-moving basis. Aside from agriculture being the main backbone of the town's economy, commerce and trade also became the second economic-based income of the town and its residents with the opening of numerous business establishments, hotels, and financial institutions that generated many opportunities and more employment for its residents.

Retail industry
In 2015, the retail giant SM Prime established its first Savemore Market branch along the National Highway in the town. This was closely followed by the opening of the first Puregold Price Club store, a popular retail chain, in the same year. Two years later, in 2017, the well-known multinational fast-food chain Jollibee opened its first branch in the area, providing residents with a wider variety of dining options.
The opening of Jollibee was just the beginning, as more fast-food chains like McDonald's and Mang Inasal have plans to establish branches in the town's first mall, Xentro Mall. Furthermore, in 2019, 7-Eleven opened a branch in the town, offering convenience store services and products to the residents.

Banking and finance services
Banking institutions like BDO Unibank, Development Bank of the Philippines, Producers Bank, FICO Bank, and other smaller financial institutions put up their branches in the town which is a good indication that the town is gearing towards rapid commercialization. As of 31 December 2021, Tumauini has a total of 10 banks with a total volume of bank deposits at Php 1.5 billion.

Government

Local government
The municipality is governed by a mayor designated as its local chief executive and by a municipal council as its legislative body in accordance with the Local Government Code. The mayor, vice mayor, and councilors are elected directly by the people through an election that is held every three years.

Elected officials

Congress representation
Tumauini, belonging to the first legislative district of the province of Isabela, is currently represented by Antonio T. Albano.

Education
The Schools Division of Isabela governs the town's public education system. The division office is a field office of the DepEd in Cagayan Valley region. The office governs the public and private elementary and public and private high schools throughout the municipality.

Higher educational institutions 
Tumauini has only one higher education institution which is accredited and fully recognized by CHED.
HGBaquiran College

Tourism
This quiet town boasts a famous historical landmark, the Tumauini Church. Built in the 1780s by the Dominicans, the church has a unique cylindrical bell tower made of bricks. Also, one of the popular tourist attractions of the town is the Camp Samal Resort and Leisure Park were known as a semi-Tagaytay because of being high on its location where one can view the entire town in the west, south, and north and the Cordillera Sierra Madre in the east.

San Matias Parish Church

The Parish Church of San Matias was built in the 1780s by the Dominicans. This is the best-preserved church ensemble in Isabela although its Convento is in ruins. The church can be considered to be the best and most artistic brick structure in the Philippines. The delicate brickwork is evident in the church itself and also in the cylindrical, confectionery-like bell tower (a later addition). In the Convento vaulted ceiling impressions may still be seen of the mats that were used as forms to mold wet plaster during construction.  A low, undulating brick wall circumscribes the front garden. [PDI, Dec 16, 2001] 

First, the building of light materials by Francisco Nunez O. P., dedicated to the Patron Saint, in 1707. It separated from Cabagan and became a regular parish in 1751. The Roman Catholic Church was erected by the Dominican in 1753. They were made of bricks and coral stones with a unique cylindrical bell tower, the only of its kind in the Philippines was constructed by Fr. Domingo Forto in 1793 and completed in 1805, became the capital of Isabela for some time in the 1880s. The Church was partly damaged during World War II and repaired to its original form by the faithful of Tumauini.

Furthermore, the church's architectural design bears traces of Chinese artistry which confirms the belief that long before the Spaniards came to the Philippines, the Chinese had settled in the coastal towns of Northern Luzon.

By virtue of Presidential Decree # 260, 11 August 1973, as amended by Executive Order No. 357, 14 January 1974, and No. 1505, 11 June 1978, the Church of Tumauini was declared a National Historic Landmark on February 24, 1989.

Camp Samal

The historic Camp Samal was the site of the National Jamboree in 1977 and is the home of the Boy Scouts of the Philippines. It is endowed with natural springs, evergreen grasses, trees, and shrubs. It overlooks the Cagayan River, the Pinacanauan River, the town of Tumauini itself, the municipality of Delfin Albano, and the Sierra Mountain ranges.

Its name was derived from the first syllable of the surnames of the spouses, Ricardo C. Sadornas and Purificacion Malana who donated the camp to the Boy Scouts of the Philippines in 1954. After the holding of the 1977 National Jamboree, the camp slept for 26 years until the assumption of Arnold S. Bautista in July 2001 as Municipal Mayor, who drew out the support of the government and private sectors for its restoration and development. It is still the favorite destination of the Boy Scouts and Girl Scouts of the Philippines for their annual district and provincial encampments. It hosted another big event which is the 5th Northeastern Luzon Regional and Ilocos Region Invitational Jamboree of the Boy Scouts of the Philippines held last November 25 – 30, 2004 with a total of 5,281 participants.

Mangi Festival
Patronal town fiesta in honor of St. Mathias and the promotion of Tumauini as a source of corn and its by-products. Tumauini is also the home of St. Mathias Church, a Spanish brick colonial church (1753) with the only cylindrical belfry in the country and is considered a national cultural treasure.

One of the most enduring legacies of the Spanish colonial era lives on, quite literally in Tumauini, corn Maize. It was one of the plants that came aboard the galleons and became one of the primary crops of the Philippines. Corn seems to have transcended to being a mere crop in Tumauini. The late National Artist for Dance, Ramon Obusan traced the origins of a traditional dance inspired by the crop to Tumauini. Thus, a corn-inspired festival seemed especially appropriate for Tumauini.

Magoli River

Antagan 1st is a serene river that boasts of its natural beauty, which is a source of inspiration for many. It winds its way through highways and paths, providing a picturesque view of the surrounding mountains and hills. The Magoli River is one of Tumauini's most treasured landmarks and is a major tourist attraction in the municipality. Its location offers a refreshing view of the natural landscape and is a source of pride for the local community. The river also provides an ample source of water for irrigation, fields, and households through its fresh running water.
One of the most striking features of the river is the Blue Lagoon, a tranquil spot that is perfect for finding inner peace. The Blue Lagoon is truly a sight to behold, with its deep blue water and natural artistic water features that have been shaped by time. The locals have named two large rocks in the center of the river "Kambal na Bato" (twin stones) which are also a major tourist attraction because of their unique and unusual appearance.

References

External links

 
 Municipal Profile at the National Competitiveness Council of the Philippines
 Tumauini at the Isabela Government Website
 Local Governance Performance Management System
 [ Philippine Standard Geographic Code]
 Philippine Census Information
 Municipality of Tumauini

Municipalities of Isabela (province)
Populated places on the Rio Grande de Cagayan